Ionuț Angelotti Trocan (born 7 October 1995) is a Romanian professional footballer who plays as a defender for Universitatea II Craiova.

References

External links
 
 

1995 births
Living people
Romanian footballers
Association football defenders
Liga I players
CS Pandurii Târgu Jiu players
CS Universitatea Craiova players
Sportspeople from Craiova